The 20th Field Artillery Regiment, RCA is a Canadian Forces Primary Reserve artillery regiment of 41 Canadian Brigade Group, composed of the Headquarters and Services Battery and two firing batteries, the 61st Field Battery, RCA, based in Edmonton and 78th Field Battery, RCA, based in Red Deer, Alberta.

Allocated Batteries 

 61st Field Battery, RCA
 78th Field Battery, RCA

Lineage 

 Originated on 2 February 1920, in Edmonton, Alberta as the 20th Brigade, CFA.
 Redesignated on 1 July 1925, as the 20th Field Brigade, CA.
 Redesignated on 3 June 1935, as the 20th Field Brigade, RCA.
 Redesignated on 7 November 1940, as the 20th (Reserve) Field Brigade, RCA.
 Redesignated on 1 March 1943, as the 20th (Reserve) Field Regiment, RCA.
 Redesignated on 1 April 1946, as the 20th Heavy Anti-Aircraft Regiment, RCA.
 Redesignated on 21 September 1954, as the 96th Independent Medium Battery, RCA.
 Redesignated on 12 April 1960, as the 96th Independent Medium Artillery Battery, RCA.
 Redesignated on 17 October 1961, as the 20th Medium Artillery Regiment, RCA.
 Redesignated on 4 December 1964, as the 20th Field Artillery Regiment, RCA.

Royal Canadian Army Cadets 
The regiment is associated with three Army Cadet corps: 180 Royal Canadian Army Cadet Corps in Edmonton, 1390 Royal Canadian Army Cadet Corps in Red Deer, and 2561 Royal Canadian Army Cadet Corps in Thorsby, Alberta.

Order of precedence

See also

 Military history of Canada
 History of the Canadian Army
 Canadian Forces
 List of armouries in Canada

References

External links
 

Field artillery regiments of Canada
Military units and formations established in 1964